The Murray County Courthouse in Sulphur, Oklahoma, on Wyandotte Avenue between W. Tenth Street and W. Eleventh Street, is a historic Classical Revival-style courthouse that was built in 1923.  It was listed on the National Register of Historic Places in 1984.

Designed by architect Jewell Hicks, it was listed on the National Register as part of a multiple property submission for numerous Oklahoma courthouses considered in a 1983 study.

References 

Courthouses on the National Register of Historic Places in Oklahoma
Neoclassical architecture in Oklahoma
Government buildings completed in 1923
Buildings and structures in Murray County, Oklahoma
County courthouses in Oklahoma
National Register of Historic Places in Murray County, Oklahoma